Chryse was a town of Bithynia, mentioned by Stephanus of Byzantium as being near Chalcedon.

The site of Chryse is unlocated.

References

Populated places in Bithynia
Former populated places in Turkey
Lost ancient cities and towns
History of Istanbul Province